Georgie White Clark (1911–1992) was a river-running guide in the Grand Canyon. She was the first woman to run the Grand Canyon as a commercial enterprise, and she introduced several innovations and adjustments to the way that guides ran the Colorado. In particular, she used large army-surplus rafts, often lashing together multiple rafts, to maintain stability in the large rapids. In 2001, the United States Board on Geographic Names renamed Mile 24 Rapid in her honor.

Early years 
Born Bessie DeRoss in Oklahoma, she was raised in Denver, CO from the age of nine. She married Harold Clark while still in high school and had a daughter, Sommona Rose, at the age of 17. She moved to Chicago for several years, then to New York City with her husband, finding office work at Radio City Music Hall, and divorced him not long after a cross-country bicycle trip in 1936. She was briefly married to James White.

The West and the Grand Canyon 
Georgie and her daughter were close companions after her divorce from Clark, engaging in outdoor activities such as mountain and rock climbing, skiing, skating, and bicycling. In 1944, her 15-year-old daughter was killed by a hit-and-run driver while bicycling. She took to hiking in the desert with a friend, Harry Aleson. They found in one another what author David Lavender calls a mutual sedation for the lonely, restless questing that was eating out their insides. Harry had recently fallen in love with the lower Colorado River through Grand Canyon, and invited White on a different sort of adventure, to demonstrate  that in the event of a boating accident, it would be easier to float downstream than hike out. Though wearing the bulky "Mae West" life jacket, they were still able to carry backpacks for watertight tins that contained first-aid supplies, food, cameras and film. They arrived exhausted three days later at Lake Mead. 
The eccentric pair wanted to prove beyond a doubt that river travel was a safe proposition, and provide good press for the emerging commercial rafting industry. So in June 1946, Aleson and White hiked down Parashant Wash, arriving at the Colorado River at mile 198. After recovering from their epic hike, where they nearly perished from thirst, they built a raft fashioned after James White's, who had allegedly been the first to float the Grand Canyon in 1867. But they were unable to launch it into the raging torrent, running the same volume as the previous year. They opted instead to use a one-man U.S. Army Air Corps rescue raft that they had packed in. So on June 26, they began an epic journey down to Lake Mead, unimaginable by modern river runners.

White was the first woman to row the full length of Marble and Grand Canyons in 1952.  She made her name when, in the early 1950s, she lashed three rafts together to achieve better stability in big rapids and began taking paying customers to "share the expense" of running the river. Her methods were controversial, as those who ran the river in wooden rowboats such as dories disdained the rubber rafts. She shrugged off her detractors and kept her river-guiding business going for 45 years. Her "Royal River Rats" achieved some fame, being featured in Life Magazine, The Tonight Show Starring Johnny Carson, and countless newspapers.  At the age of 73, she could be seen holding her motor rig's tiller with one hand and a beer with the other, wearing a full-length leopard-pattern leotard. Her last Grand Canyon trip took place in September 1991 as she was approaching her 80th birthday. She died of cancer in 1992 at age 81.

Following her death, those who examined her personal effects found artifacts which led some to speculate that White had, in fact, been Bessie Hyde, the woman who had vanished with her husband during a honeymoon float of the Grand Canyon in 1928. Rumors had floated that Bessie had killed her abusive husband and hiked out of the Canyon. Among White's personal effects were a copy of the Hydes' marriage license and a pistol in her lingerie drawer. However, river historian Brad Dimock and White's biographer Richard Westwood have discounted the rumor that White and Hyde were the same person.

The renaming of Mile 24 Rapid in her honor was controversial. Georgie's detractors were many; in addition, her friends would have liked to see a bigger, more prominent rapid named for her. Rapids such as Crystal and Granite were unlikely to be renamed, and on October 11, 2001, the U.S. Board on Geographic Names followed the Arizona State Boards on Geographic and Historic Names and approved renaming Twenty-Four Mile Rapid as Georgie Rapid in a split 3–2 vote.

The detractors were many due to Georgie's habit of disregarding her customers' safety. Her business had the distinction of having the first rafting commercial fatality, Mae Hansen, aged 64, in July 1972, and the first injured person to be evacuated by helicopter from the Grand Canyon, Vernon Read, who suffered severe skull and spinal fractures on a trip in 1959. On August 25, 1984, river guide John Davenport, watched as Georgie intentionally launched her boat into a dangerous position into Lava Falls Rapid (River Mile 179.4), and reported

Customer Norine Abrams died as a result of these actions. When National Park Service Ranger Kim Crumbo arrived to transport Ms. Abram's body out, Georgie became frustrated because the transportation was taking too long. She had new customers arriving and she didn't want them to see the body bag. She so annoyed the ranger (who had injured his back moving the body) that "Ranger Crumbo said 'Georgie, you just killed this woman, now you want me to hurry up and hide the body?' Georgie stared Crumbo in the eye and said, 'You're damned right I do. Now get her out of sight before you scare these new people.'"

Further reading 
 DeRoss, Rose Marie (1970). Adventures of Georgie White, TV's "Woman of the Rivers". Gardner Printing and Mailing Co. .
 Westwood, Dick (1997). Woman of the River: Georgie White Clark, White Water Pioneer. Utah State University Press. .
 Dimock, Brad (2001). Sunk Without a Sound: The Tragic Colorado River Honeymoon of Glen and Bessie Hyde . Fretwater Press. .
 Briggs, Don (1999). River Runners of the Grand Canyon, VHS/DVD
 Ghiglieri, Michael P. and Thomas M. Myers (2001). "Over the Edge: Death in Grand Canyon". Puma Press.

References 

Early Grand Canyon river runners
1911 births
1992 deaths